Clark Kauffman is an American farmer and politician from Idaho. Kauffman is a Republican member of Idaho House of Representatives representing District 25 in the B seat since 2012.

Early life
Kauffman was born in Twin Falls, Idaho. Kauffman graduated from Filer High School.

Career 
In 1968, Kauffman served in the United States Air Force, until 1972.

Kauffman and his wife Debbie are owner and operator of Kauffman Farm in Idaho.

On November 6, 2012, Kauffman won the election and became a Republican member of Idaho House of Representatives for District 25, seat B. On November 4, 2014, as an incumbent, Kauffman won the election unopposed and continued serving District 25, seat B. On November 8, 2016, as an incumbent, Kauffman won the election unopposed and continued serving District 25, seat B. On November 6, 2018, as an incumbent, Kauffman won the election unopposed and continued serving District 25, seat B.

Election history

Personal life 
Kauffman's wife is Debbie Kauffman. They have two children. Kauffman and his family live in Filer, Idaho.

References

External links
Clark Kauffman at the Idaho Legislature
clarkkauffman.com (Campaign site)
 Biography at Ballotpedia
 Financial information (state office) at the National Institute for Money in State Politics

Farmers from Idaho
Year of birth missing (living people)
Living people
Republican Party members of the Idaho House of Representatives
People from Twin Falls, Idaho
21st-century American politicians
People from Twin Falls County, Idaho